Margaret Diane "Maggie" Weston (born January 1948) is a British former makeup artist. She is married to Terry Gilliam.

She was nominated for an Academy Award in the category Best Makeup and Hairstyling for the film The Adventures of Baron Munchausen. She also won the BAFTA Film Award for Best Makeup in 1990 at the 43rd British Academy Film Awards.

Selected filmography
 The Adventures of Baron Munchausen (1988)

References

Living people
1948 births
Best Makeup BAFTA Award winners
British make-up artists